The 1973 Ice Hockey World Championships were the 40th Ice Hockey World Championships and the 51st European Championships of ice hockey. The tournament took place in the Soviet Union from 31 March to 15 April and the games were played at the Palace of Sports of the Central Lenin Stadium in Moscow.

Six teams took part in the main tournament, with each team playing each other twice. The Soviet Union took back their world title and became World Champions for the twelfth time.

World Championship Group A (Soviet Union)

West Germany was relegated to Group B.

World Championship Group B (Austria)
Played in Graz, 22 to 31 March. The Austrian team was coached by Father David Bauer who had established the Canada men's national ice hockey team.

East Germany was promoted to Group A, both Switzerland and Italy were relegated to group C.  Rating Austria, Japan and Switzerland against each other head to head, they each had two points, Austria had a goal differential of +2, Japan +1, and Switzerland -3.

World Championship Group C (Netherlands)
Played in Geleen, Rotterdam, Nijmegen, Utrecht, Tilburg and The Hague, from 9 to 18 March.

Norway and the Netherlands were promoted to Group B.

Ranking and statistics

Tournament Awards
Best players selected by the directorate:
Best Goaltender:       Jiří Holeček
Best Defenceman:       Valeri Vasiliev
Best Forward:          Boris Mikhailov
Media All-Star Team:
Goaltender:  Jiří Holeček
Defence:  Alexander Gusev,  Börje Salming
Forwards:  Valeri Kharlamov,  Boris Mikhailov,  Vladimir Petrov

Final standings
The final standings of the tournament according to IIHF:

European championships final standings
The final standings of the European championships according to IIHF:

References

External links
Complete results

IIHF Men's World Ice Hockey Championships
World Championships
World Ice Hockey Championships
International ice hockey competitions hosted by the Soviet Union
March 1973 sports events in Europe
April 1973 sports events in Europe
Sports competitions in Moscow
1973 in Moscow
1973 in Russia
International ice hockey competitions hosted by the Netherlands
International ice hockey competitions hosted by Austria
Sport in Graz
Sports competitions in Nijmegen
Sports competitions in Tilburg
Sports competitions in Rotterdam
20th century in Rotterdam
Sports competitions in The Hague
20th century in The Hague
1972–73 in Austrian ice hockey
1972–73 in Dutch ice hockey